Elizabeth Thabethe (26 September 1959 – 26 March 2021) was the Deputy Minister of Tourism in South Africa. She was affiliated with the African National Congress and was a member of the National Assembly.

As of July 2018, she had no recorded appearances at parliamentary meetings.

Thabethe died on 26 March 2021, age 61, from injuries she had sustained in a traffic collision.

See also

African Commission on Human and Peoples' Rights
Constitution of South Africa
History of the African National Congress
Politics in South Africa
Provincial governments of South Africa

References

1959 births
2021 deaths
Members of the National Assembly of South Africa
African National Congress politicians
Road incident deaths in South Africa